The 1951–52 season was Cardiff City F.C.'s 25th season in the Football League. They competed in the 22-team Division Two, then the second tier of English football, finishing second, winning promotion to Division One.

Season review

Football League Second Division

Partial league table

Results by round

Welsh Cup

After a 3–1 victory over Milford United, Cardiff were eliminated in the sixth round by Merthyr Tydfil.

Players

Fixtures and results

Second Division

FA Cup

Welsh Cup

See also
List of Cardiff City F.C. seasons

References

Cardiff City F.C. seasons
Association football clubs 1951–52 season
Card